Campo santo is a word for cemetery in Italian and Spanish and may refer to:

People
 Andrés del Campo Santos (born 1980), Spanish footballer
 Henrique Campos Santos (born 1990), Brazilian footballer
 Rayllan Campos Santos (born 1989), Brazilian footballer
 Thiago Campos Santos (born 1984), Brazilian footballer

Places
 Campo Santo, Salta, a town and municipality in Salta Province, northwestern Argentina
 Camposanto, a comune in the Province of Modena, Italy
 El Campo Santo Cemetery, City of Industry, California
 Campo Santo, Ghent, a Roman Catholic burial ground in Belgium
 Campo Santo de La Loma, a cemetery in Manila, Philippines
 San Joaquin Campo Santo, a cemetery in Iloilo, Philippines

Other uses
 Battle of Campo Santo, part of the War of the Austrian Succession, fought in Camposanto, Italy in 1743
 Camposanto Monumentale, or Campo Santo, or Camposanto Vecchio, a historical edifice in Pisa, Italy
 Campo Santo de' Tedeschi, part of the Circus of Nero
 Campo Santo Teutonico, a Catholic college in Rome
 Santa Maria della Pietà in Camposanto dei Teutonici, a Roman Catholic church in Vatican City
 Campo Santo, a book by W. G. Sebald
 Campo Santo (company), video game developer of Firewatch